Remona Burchell (born September 15, 1991) is a Jamaican sprinter.  While running for the University of Alabama, she became a three time NCAA Champion, winning the 60 meters at the NCAA Indoor Championships in 2014 and 2015. She set her 100 meter personal record of 11.03 seconds in a qualifying meet to get to the 2014 NCAA Outdoor Championships, where she won the championship (running 11.17 seconds into a severe headwind).

Prior to running in the United States, she ran for Cambridge high school and later Herbert Morrison technical High School, both in Jamaica.

She represented Jamaica at the 2018 World Indoor Championships.

References

External links

Living people
1991 births
Jamaican female sprinters
University of Alabama alumni
Athletes (track and field) at the 2020 Summer Olympics
Olympic athletes of Jamaica
Olympic gold medalists in athletics (track and field)
Olympic gold medalists for Jamaica
Medalists at the 2020 Summer Olympics
20th-century Jamaican women
21st-century Jamaican women
Athletes (track and field) at the 2022 Commonwealth Games
Commonwealth Games bronze medallists for Jamaica
Commonwealth Games medallists in athletics
Medallists at the 2022 Commonwealth Games